Nezam Mahalleh (also Romanized as Nez̧ām Maḩalleh; also known as  Tappeh and Tappeh Sar) is a village in Azadegan Rural District, in the Central District of Galugah County, Mazandaran Province, Iran. At the 2006 census, its population was 895, in 237 families.

References 

Populated places in Galugah County